The Afghan Border Force (ABF) was responsible for security of Afghanistan's border area with neighboring countries extending up to  into the interior and formed part of the Afghan National Army. In December 2017, most of the Afghan Border Police (ABP) personnel of the Afghan National Police were transferred to the Afghan National Army to form the Afghan Border Force. The ABP retained 4,000 personnel for customs operations at border crossings and international airports such as checking documents of foreigners entering the country or deporting them. 

The ABF's, and its predecessor the ABP, anti-narcotic efforts were a prominent concern to the international community during the War in Afghanistan. The ABF, and the ABP in its former role, patrolled a 50 km-wide corridor along the entirety of Afghanistan's  border, particularly the long and porous Durand Line border in the southeast with neighboring Pakistan.

Organization 
The ABP fell under the command of the Afghan National Police (ANP) which was under the administrative control of the Ministry of Interior Affairs. The ABP was headquartered in Kabul, in the nation's capital, and was commanded by a Lieutenant General. Prior to 2017, the Afghan Border Police divided command of its 23,000 members across 6 zones to protect 14 Border Crossing Points and 5 Major Airports.

Mazar-e-Sharif (Northern Zone)

Faryab Province
Almar District
Shirin Tagab District
Dawlat Abad District
Qaramqol District
Andkhoy District
Khani Chahar Bagh District
Jowzjan Province
Khwaja du koh District
Khamyab District
Qarqin District
Balkh Province
Shortepa District
Kaldar District
Kunduz Province
Qalay-I-Zal District
Imam Sahib District

Fayzabad (Northeastern Zone)
Takhar Province
Khwaja Ghar District
Yangi Qala District
Sarqad District
Chah Ab District
Badakhshan Province
Shahri Buzurg District
Yawan District
Ragh District
Kuf Ab District
Shekay District
Darwaz district
Darvaz-e Bala District
Shighnan District
Ishkashim District
Wakhan District
Zebak District
Kuran wa Munjan District

Jalalabad (Eastern Zone)

Nuristan Province
Bargi Matal District
Kamdesh District
Kunar Province
Nari District
Dangam District
Marawara District
Sirkanay District
Khas Kunar District
Nangarhar Province
Goshta District
Lal Pur District
Momand Dara District
Dur Baba District
Achin District
Dih Bala District
Pachir Wa Agam District
Khogyani District
Sherzad District

Gardez (Southeastern Zone)

Paktia Province
Azra District
Zazi District
Dand Wa Patan District
Khost Province
Jaji Maydan District
Bak District
Tirazayi District
Khost District
Gurbuz District
Tani District
Spera District
Paktika Province
Ziruk District
Urgon District
Gayan District
Barmal District
Gomal District
Wor Mamay District

Kandahar (Southern Zone)

Zabul Province
Shamulzayi District
Atghar District
Kandahar Province
Maruf District
Arghistan District
Spin Boldak District
Shorabak District
Reg District
Helmand Province
Garmsir District
Dishu District
Nimruz Province
Chahar Burjak District
Zaranj District
Kang District

Herat (Western Zone)

Farah Province
Lash Wa Juwayn District
Shib Koh District
Qala i Kah District
Anar Dara District
Herat Province
Adraskan District
Ghoryan District
Kohsan District
Gulran District
Kushk District
Kushki Kuhna District
Badghis Province
Ab Kamari District
Muqur District
Murghab District
Ghormach District

The majority of the Afghan Border Police officers were trained by the United States Armed Forces and various Federal government employees as well as by the European Union Police Mission (EUPOL). In order to prepare for their duties as ABP, recruits attended an 8-week course designed by the German Bundespolizei (BPOL). Also Italy provided qualified training to ABP personnel in West Region by TF GRIFO deployed in Herat by the Guardia di Finanza. The BPOL were still heavily involved in mentoring ABP officers as of 2009.

In January 2011, there were at least 25 U.S. Immigration and Customs Enforcement and Customs and Border Protection officers providing training to the Afghan Border Police. Homeland Security Secretary Janet Napolitano stated that the number could reach 65 or more by the end of 2011. Napolitano visited the Torkham border crossing with Pakistan and was satisfied with the progress being made there.

The ABP was known to have jointly trained with the Tajik Border Troops, its equivalent in Tajikistan, which was overseen by the Organization for Security and Co-operation in Europe.

References

External links 

 Combined Security Transition Command – Afghanistan

Border guards
Law enforcement in the Islamic Republic of Afghanistan
Defunct law enforcement agencies of Afghanistan